Garage is an alcopop produced by the Finnish brewery Sinebrychoff. As of 2017, it is produced and marketed in two flavours, called "Hard Lemonade" and "Hard Ice Tea". Both flavours have an alcohol content of 4.6%. The "Hard Lemonade" flavour has its origins in the United States. Garage is currently sold at least in the United States, Russia, Kazakhstan, Estonia, Denmark, Sweden, Ukraine, Belarus, Latvia, Hungary, Canada, Poland and Finland. Garage has had good progress in the global market, as an example in 2013 its sales in Finland grew by 30%.

References

Alcopops
Finnish alcoholic drinks